John Morgan Pratt (March 23, 1886, Sharpsville, Indiana – June 15, 1954, Chicago, Illinois) was a tax resistance leader, activist in the  Old Right, publicist and newspaper man.  Along with James E. Bistor, he led what was probably the largest tax strike since the Era of the American Revolution.

Pratt was born into a background of wealth. His father owned a tomato cannery and extensive farmland in the Sharpsville area. He attended Marion College, where he studied to be a teacher. In this period, the family lost most of its money because the cannery business failed. As a result, he permanently shelved a teaching career and moved to homestead farmland in northern Saskatchewan. Eventually, it became one of the largest farms in the immediate area. In 1913, Pratt began a long political career when the counselors of Lost River, a rural municipality, elected him as their secretary treasurer. One of his duties was tax collection. The irony was not lost on Pratt who often joked about it during his stint as a tax rebel in Chicago.

The life of a tax collector did not suit Pratt who moved to Winnipeg in 1917 to accept a position as municipal editor of The Grain Growers Guide, which spoke for the nascent cooperative movement in Canada. Pratt's views on taxation as reflected in his columns reflected an affinity for theories of Henry George. Like George, he supported the replacement of the predominant local tax on acreage with a "system of taxing the unimproved values of land."

In 1921, Pratt moved permanently to Chicago, where he took a job with the Universal Feature and Specialty Company, a national newspaper syndicate. From there, he went on to become advertising manager of the Chicago Herald and Examiner, one of the two newspapers of William Randolph Hearst in the city. In addition to his other duties, he organized public relations for the Hearst-sponsored tour of Queen Marie of Romania.

In 1930, Pratt quit his newspaper job to take the helm as executive director of the Association of Real Estate Taxpayers (ARET), an organization of real-estate taxpayers in Chicago and Cook County. Between 1931 and 1933, it organized one of the largest tax strikes in American history. The chief demand of ARET was that local and state governments obey a long-ignored provision of the Illinois Constitution of 1870 requiring uniform taxation for all forms of property, Pratt charged that the failure to assess such personal property as furniture, cars, and stocks and bonds was not only illegal but left owners of real estate with excessive burdens. ARET's program also included support for sweeping rate reductions in the general property tax and retrenchment in local governmental spending.

ARET functioned primarily as a cooperative legal service. Each member paid annual dues of $15 to fund lawsuits challenging the constitutionality of real-estate assessments. The radical side of the movement became apparent by early 1931 when ARET called for taxpayers to withhold real-estate taxes (or "strike") pending a final ruling by the Illinois Supreme Court, and later the U.S. Supreme Court. Mayor Anton Cermak and other politicians desperately tried to break the strike by threatening criminal prosecution of Pratt and other ARET leaders and revocation of city services. ARET's influence peaked in late 1932, with a membership approaching 30,000 (largely skilled workers and small-business owners). By this time, it had a budget of over $600,000 and a radio show in Chicago. But it suffered a demoralizing blow in October 1932 when the U.S. Supreme Court refused to hear a case it had brought. Buffeted by political coercion and legal defeats, and torn by internal factionalism, the strike collapsed in early 1933.

In the two decades after the collapse of ARET, Pratt continued to be active in various organizations on the Old Right. To Pratt, participation in these organizations bespoke a deep suspicion of government paternalism. In 1940, for example, Pratt organized the National Physicians Committee for the Extension of Medical Service. The Committee received funding from publisher, Frank Gannett.  It played a major role in defeating President Harry S. Truman's plan for governmentally subsidized insurance. He also organization a group called the Heritage Foundation (different from the current group of the same name) which published and distributed the books of Clarence Manion, a key figure in the Old Right, and Paul Harvey, then a young radio commentator. Pratt was the father of set designer, John T. Pratt, the husband of dancer Katherine Dunham.

References
David T. Beito, Taxpayers in Revolt: Tax Resistance during the Great Depression (Chapel Hill: University of North Carolina Press, 1989).

American tax resisters
Indiana Wesleyan University alumni
Old Right (United States)
1954 deaths
1886 births
Activists from Chicago
American expatriates in Canada